Mandaon, officially the Municipality of Mandaon,  is a 3rd class municipality in the province of Masbate, Philippines. According to the 2020 census, it has a population of 44,122 people.

History
Mandaon was created from portions of Milagros through Executive Order No. 244 signed by President Elpidio Quirino on July 18, 1949.

Geography

Barangays
Mandaon is politically subdivided into 26 barangays.

Climate

Demographics

Economy

Education

The municipality is home to the 3,668-hectare campus of the only state college in the province of Masbate: the Dr. Emilio B. Espinosa Sr. Memorial State College of Agriculture and Technology (DEBESMSCAT), named after the former congressman of the province, Dr. Emilio B. Espinosa, Sr.

Secondary Schools
 Federico A. Estipona Memorial High School
 Cabitan National High School
 San Pablo National High School
Buri National High School
 Bugtong National High School
 Cleofe A. Arce Memorial High School
Lantangan High School
Tumalaytay High School

Elementary Schools
Cabitan Central School
Jose Zurbito Mesa S. Memorial Elementary School
Bugtong Elementary School
Pulo Dacu Elementary School

References

External links
 [ Philippine Standard Geographic Code]
Philippine Census Information
Local Governance Performance Management System

Municipalities of Masbate
Establishments by Philippine executive order